Ko Chang is an amphoe (district) in Trat province, Thailand. It is on the Gulf of Thailand's eastern seaboard,  from Bangkok, near the border with Cambodia.

The island Ko Chang occupies most of the district's land area, along with several smaller islands. The name Ko Chang means 'Elephant Island' and derives from its elephant-shaped headland. Despite the presence of elephants on the island, they are not indigenous. At present, there are eight villages on the island.

History

Prior to World War II, Ko Chang was little known. During this period, the few families there made a living growing coconuts and fruits.

On 17 January 1941, Ko Chang was the scene of the Battle of Ko Chang between the Royal Thai Navy and a much stronger Vichy French naval squadron, in which the French won a decisive victory. Ko Chang Yutthanawi Day, which occurs in late-January at the Ko Chang Yutthanawi Memorial on Laem Ngop, commemorates the Royal Thai Navy's engagement against the French colonialists. There is an exhibition by the Royal Thai Navy, and merit-making and tribute rites are performed for those killed in the battle.

Geography
Ko Chang is part of an archipelago of 52 islands.

The island is known for several waterfalls, coral reefs, and rainforests.

The main settlements on the west coast are around Sai Khao, Hat Kai Mook, Hat Kai Bae, Ban Klong Prao and the fishing village of Bang Bao on the south coast. The island's administrative centre is Ban Dan Mai on the east coast.

Climate
Two provinces, Trat and Ranong, receive more than  a year making them the wettest places in the country.

Wildlife
Ko Chang is home to populations of 29 species of mammals, for example, the stump-tailed macaque, the small Indian civet, the small Asian mongoose, 61 bird species, and a number of snakes and deer.

The Ko Chang frog (Limnonectes kohchangae) was originally thought to be an endemic species, but has also been found on the mainland.

Administration
The island forms a district (amphoe) in the province of Trat. It was formed on 30 April 1994, when it was split off from Laem Ngop district, at first being classed as a minor district (king amphoe). On 15 May 2007, the nation's 81 minor districts were upgraded to full districts. With publication in the Royal Gazette on 24 August, the upgrade became official.

Ko Chang district is divided into two sub-districts (tambons) which are home to nine villages (mubans):

1. Ko Chang, consisting of four villages with 3,010 inhabitants:
Ban Khlong Nonsi
Ban Dan Mai
Ban Khlong Son
Ban Khlong Phrao

2. Ko Chang Tai, consisting of five villages with 2,346 inhabitants:
Bang Bao
Ban Salak Phet
Ban Chek Bae
Ban Salak Khok
Ban Salak Phet Nuea

Transport

Air
Ko Chang has no airport. The nearest airport is Trat Airport  from the Ao Thammachat Ko Chang ferry terminal on the mainland.

Road
There are two main roads on Ko Chang, running the length of the east and west coasts. Both roads start at Ao Sapparot in the north, near the ferry piers. Shorter roads branch out to Ploytalay Resort and Keereephet, Khlong Nueng, and Klong Phu waterfalls.

The nearest long-distance road transport is at Trat town, from where the  journey to Bangkok takes five hours by bus.

Boat
There are two ferry companies that run services from the mainland to Ko Chang. Both take vehicles and passengers. During high season, from November to May, there are passenger-only boat services from Ko Chang to the outlying islands of Ko Wai, Ko Mak, and Ko Kut.
Boats do not run to outlying islands all year . They stop August / September times due to big seas and low season.

Economy
Ko Chang's income derives largely from tourism, but some traditional livelihoods still exist. Many of Ko Chang's villages rely on fishing, with Ban Salak Phet being the largest and oldest community on Ko Chang, in a sheltered location in the south of the island. Other fishing villages include Bang Bao, at Bang Bao Beach, which consists of houses on stilts built into the sea, and Ban Khlong Son, which also partly relies on rubber plantations. Ban Dan Mai and Ban Khlong Non Si also have coconut plantations, and orchards of lychee trees. The variety of lychee grown, Silaman 200 years, is believed to be found only on Ko Chang.

The first foreign backpackers started arriving on Ko Chang in the mid-1970s, using local fishing boats, when the island was still undeveloped. In 2019 tourism is the island's biggest earner. In 1982, Ko Chang along with the surrounding area became part of the protected Mu Ko Chang National Park, with approximately 85 percent of the island, together with nearby coral reefs, falling within the park.

In 2020, an American tourist was arrested for posting negative feedback about his experience at a hotel in Ko Chang. While the tourist was released from prison after apologizing, TripAdvisor, for the first time ever, placed a warning to prospective customers on the hotel's TripAdvisor page, regarding the incident.

Gallery

References

External links

Ko Chang Tourist Police
Ko Chang Ferry Timetables
Trat Airport Guide

Ko Chang
Chang
Islands of the Gulf of Thailand

da:Koh chang
et:Chang
es:Ko Chang
fr:Ko Chang
ko:꼬 창
bpy:আম্ফোয়ে কো চাং
it:Koh Chang
nl:Koh Chang
ja:チャーン島
pl:Ko Chang
ru:Чанг (остров)
fi:Ko Chang
sv:Ko Chang
vi:Ko Chang
zh:象岛 (泰国)